|-
!align=center style=background:Yellow |Seniors
|-

|-

|-
!align=center style=background:Yellow | Juniors
|-

|-

|-
!align=center style=background:Yellow | Juniors
|-

The Sweden national ringette team, more commonly known as "Team Sweden", is the ringette team representing Sweden internationally. Sweden has both a senior national ringette team and a junior national ringette team. Both Team Sweden Senior and Team Sweden Junior are overseen by the Sweden Ringette Association (SRA), and compete in the World Ringette Championships (WRC). The SRA is a member of the International Ringette Federation (IRF). Sweden's first appearance in international ringette took place at the second World Ringette Championships in 1992. Team USA is Team Sweden's arch-rival with both teams competing in the President's Pool against Team Czech.

Though Sweden joined the IRF in 1986, which at the time was known as the "World Ringette Council", the Sweden Ringette Association was not formed until 1994, then was elected as an associate member of the Swedish Sports Confederation in 2003.

History
Team Sweden (now Team Sweden Senior) made its international ringette debut in 1992 at the second World Ringette Championships (WRC) in Helsinki, Finland, where the 1992 Sweden team finished in sixth place. At the time there was only one division where athletes could compete and was reserved strictly for women. 

While the World Junior Ringette Championships first began in 2009 and occurred again in 2012, Sweden never sent a junior team to compete at either world tournament. The world junior tournament merged with the world championship program for senior teams in 2013 where world titles for a Senior Pool, Junior Pool, and President's Pool were contested. There was an exception in WRC 2016 whereby the Team Sweden Senior competed the Senior Pool and Team Sweden Junior competed in the Junior Pool.

Sweden's first junior national team (U19) was formed in 2016 and competed in the 2016 World Ringette Championships. They did not compete in 2017 and have yet to return to the world stage.

World Championship record

Senior Sweden

Junior Sweden

Team Sweden Senior
Team Sweden (Senior) made its world debut at the second World Ringette Championships (WRC) in 1992. The senior team has competed in every WRC with the exception of the world competition's inaugural year in 1990, the 1998 World Ringette Championships which was replaced by a 1998 Summit series between Team Canada and Team Finland, and the 2021 World Ringette Championships when the tournament was cancelled due to Covid-19.

1998 Seniors
The 1998 World Ringette Championships were initially meant to be held in Moncton, New Brunswick, Canada. Instead a promotional five game ringette "Summit Series" tour of Europe was organized with a series of games between a Team Canada, and Team Finland between February 27 and March 7, 1998. Team Sweden Senior did not compete that year.

Team Sweden Junior
Team Sweden Junior (U19) made its first world appearance at the 2016 World Ringette Championships in Helsinki, Finland. However, Sweden has yet to field another junior national team and has not returned to the world stage as of yet.

See also

Sweden Ringette Association
Ringette
World Ringette Championships
  Canada national ringette team
  Finland national ringette team
  United States national ringette team
  Czech Republic national ringette team
International Ringette Federation
Sam Jacks
Juhani "Juuso" Wahlsten

References

External links
 International Ringette Federation
 The History of Ringette in Calgary
  Ringette Canada
    Ringette Finland
   Team USA Ringette
    Sweden Ringette Association
   Ringette Slovakia
   Czech Ringette

Ringette
National ringette teams
Ringette
Ringette
Ringette players